Lorenzo Comendù was an Italian painter of the Baroque era,  active in Verona, painting large battle or historic canvass.

Son of a Veronese merchant, he studied with Biagio Falcieri in Verona, then Francesco Monti in Parma. He moved to Milan in 1700.

References

Year of birth unknown
Year of death unknown
17th-century Italian painters
Italian male painters
18th-century Italian painters
Italian Baroque painters
Painters from Verona
18th-century Italian male artists